The 2014–15 Vermont Catamounts men's ice hockey team represents the University of Vermont in the 2014–15 NCAA Division I men's ice hockey season. The team is coached by Kevin Sneddon, in his 12th season at Vermont. The Catamounts play their home games at the Gutterson Fieldhouse on campus in Burlington, Vermont, competing in Hockey East.

Personnel

Roster
As of November 13, 2014.

|}

Coaching staff

Standings

Schedule

|-
!colspan=12 style=""| Exhibition

|-
!colspan=12 style=""| Regular Season

|-
!colspan=12 style=""| Postseason

Rankings

References

Vermont Catamounts men's ice hockey seasons
Vermont Catamounts
Vermont Catamounts
Vermont Catamounts
Vermont Catamounts